The beach volleyball competition at the 2014 Central American and Caribbean Games was held in Veracruz, Mexico.

The tournament was scheduled to be held from 26–30 November at Marti Beach.

Medal summary

Medal table

References

External links
Official Website

2014 Central American and Caribbean Games events
2014 in beach volleyball
2014